Dimethyl carbate is an insect repellent.  It can be prepared by the Diels–Alder reaction of dimethyl maleate and cyclopentadiene.

References

Insect repellents
Methyl esters